Rich House Poor House is a British Television program starring Craig Kelly, Tertta Saarikko, Adam Stott and others. The program is directed by Danny Fildes, Marcus English, Simon Bowyer and others. The first episode was aired on 30 March 2017. The airing network is Channel 5.

The program is created and produced by Claire Collinson-Jones, Emma Read, Jon Durbridge, David Emerson and others under Hat Trick Productions.

Plot
Two families from completely opposite ends of the financial spectrum and class divide swap homes, budgets and social status for seven days to discover how the other side lives.

Cast
Craig Kelly (as Self - Narrator)
Adam Stott
Tertta Saarikko
Terhi Ketolainen
Henna Dolk Viksten
Anna Ahtiainen

Direction
The different episodes of the series are directed by different directors such as

Danny Fildes (14 episodes, 2017–2018)
Marcus English	(4 episodes, 2017)
Simon Bowyer (4 episodes, 2019–2020)

Production
The different episodes of the series are produced by different producers such as:

Claire Collinson-Jones, executive producer (21 episodes, 2017–2018)
Emma Read, executive producer (14 episodes, 2019–2021)
Jon Durbridge, executive producer / series editor (13 episodes, 2017–2018)
David Emerson, executive producer (12 episodes, 2019–2020)
Kate Roberts, series producer (12 episodes, 2019–2020)
Simon Greenwood, series producer (11 episodes, 2019–2021)
Annabel Walker, line producer (10 episodes, 2019–2020)

References

External links
 
 Rich House Poor House  on Channel 5

English-language television shows
2017 British television series debuts